Fernando Santos (born 25 February 1980) is a Brazilian former footballer who played as a defender.

Santos was born in Rio de Janeiro. He was part of the Brazilian squad for 1999 FIFA World Youth Championship but failed to make an appearance during the tournament.

Career statistics

Club

Honours
Campeonato Brasileiro Série B: 2009

References

External links 
 

Living people
1980 births
Association football defenders
Brazilian footballers
Brazil under-20 international footballers
Brazilian expatriate footballers
CR Flamengo footballers
TSV 1860 Munich players
FK Austria Wien players
MSV Duisburg players
CR Vasco da Gama players
Guaratinguetá Futebol players
Guarani FC players
Campeonato Brasileiro Série A players
Campeonato Brasileiro Série B players
Bundesliga players
Expatriate footballers in Austria
Expatriate footballers in Germany
Brazilian expatriate sportspeople in Germany
Brazilian expatriate sportspeople in Austria
Footballers from Rio de Janeiro (city)